Gödre is a village in Hegyhát District, northern Baranya county, in the Southern Transdanubia region of Hungary. Its population at the 2011 census was 913.

Geography 
It is part of the Southern Transdanubia statistical region, and administratively it falls under Baranya County and then Hegyhát District.

Demographics

2011 census 
As of the census of 2011, there were 913 residents, 348 households, and 264 families living in the village. The population density was 59 inhabitants per square mile (23/km2). There were 398 dwellings at an average density of 26 per square mile (10/km2). The average household size was 2.64. The average number of children was 1.14. The average family size was 2.91.

Religious affiliation was 67.0% Roman Catholic, 2.4% Calvinist, 0.4% Lutheran, 0.2% other religion, and 9.3% unaffiliated, with 20.7% declining to answer.

The village had an ethnic minority German population of 11.5% and a Roma population of 8.4%. A small number of residents also identified as Bulgarian, Croat and other, non-native to Hungary, totaling less than 1%. The majority declared themselves as Hungarian (82.9%), with 16.7% declining to answer.

Local government 
The village is governed by a mayor with a four-person council. The local government of the village operates a joint council office with the nearby localities of Baranyaszentgyörgy, Felsőegerszeg, Meződ, Palé, Sásd, Varga and Vázsnok. The seat of the joint council is in Sásd.

As of the election of 2019, the village also has local minority self-governments for its German and Roma communities, each with three elected representatives.

Transportation

Railway 
 Sásd Train Station,  to the southeast of the village. The station is on the Pusztaszabolcs–Pécs and Dombóvár-Komló railway lines and is operated by MÁV.

External links 
 OpenStreetMap
 Detailed Gazetteer of Hungary

Notes

References

Populated places in Baranya County